Royden Denslow Webb (October 3, 1888 – December 10, 1982) was an American film music composer.

Webb has hundreds of film music credits to his name, mainly with RKO Pictures. He is best known for film noir and horror film scores, in particular for the films of Val Lewton.

Biography
Born in Manhattan, New York, Webb orchestrated and conducted for the Broadway stage before moving to Hollywood in the late 1920s to work as music director for Radio Pictures, later RKO Pictures. He remained at RKO until 1955, then worked freelance for several years, scoring several episodes of Wagon Train. Webb is credited as composer or arranger on more than 200 films, and received Academy Award nominations for Quality Street (1937), My Favorite Wife (1940), I Married a Witch (1942), Joan of Paris (1942), The Fallen Sparrow (1943), The Fighting Seabees (1944), and The Enchanted Cottage (1945). His piano concerto from The Enchanted Cottage was performed by the Los Angeles Philharmonic Orchestra, conducted by Constantin Bakaleinikoff, in concert at the Hollywood Bowl in 1945. In 1961, a house fire destroyed Webb's manuscripts, including film scores and unpublished concert music, after which Webb ceased composing. Webb died in 1982 from a heart attack at 94.

An alumnus of Columbia University, Webb wrote the fight song "Roar, Lion, Roar" for his alma mater in 1925. Several cues composed by Webb were used in the newsreel montage of Kane's life in Citizen Kane. Several cues composed by Webb replaced those by Bernard Herrmann in The Magnificent Ambersons after the film was re-edited. Webb also composed several cues (uncredited) for This is Cinerama, the first Cinerama production in 1952.

The "Christopher Palmer Collection of Roy Webb Scores" is held at Syracuse University, New York.

Selected filmography

 Our Betters (1933)
 Down to Their Last Yacht (1934)
 Sylvia Scarlett (1935) (uncredited)
 Becky Sharp (1935)
 Enchanted April (1935)
 Stage Door (1937)
 The Woman I Love (1937)
 Quality Street (1937)
 Room Service (1938)
 Bringing Up Baby (1938)
 Arizona Legion (1939)
 The Great Man Votes (1939)
 In Name Only (1939)
 Abe Lincoln in Illinois (1940)
 My Favorite Wife (1940)
 Curtain Call (1940)
 Stranger on the Third Floor (1940)
 Mr. and Mrs. Smith (1941)
 I Married a Witch (1942)
 Joan of Paris (1942)
 The Magnificent Ambersons (1942) (additional music, uncredited).
 The Big Street (1942)
 Cat People (1942)
 Hitler's Children (1943)
 The Seventh Victim (1943)
 Journey into Fear (1943)
 I Walked with a Zombie (1943)
 The Leopard Man (1943)
 The Fallen Sparrow (1943)
 The Falcon in Danger (1943)
 Gangway for Tomorrow (1943)
 The Falcon Out West (1944)
 Experiment Perilous (1944)
 Tall in the Saddle (1944)
 The Fighting Seabees (1944)
 The Curse of the Cat People (1944)
 Murder, My Sweet (1944)
 Bride by Mistake (1944)
 The Seventh Cross (1944)
 The Enchanted Cottage (1945)
 The Body Snatcher (1945)
 Back to Bataan (1945)
 Two O'Clock Courage (1945)
 The Spiral Staircase (1945)
 Notorious (1946)
 The Locket (1946)
 Bedlam (1946)
 Out of the Past (1947)
 They Won't Believe Me (1947)
 I Remember Mama (1948)
 Mighty Joe Young (1949)
 The Window (1949)
 Easy Living (1949)
 My Friend Irma (1949)
 The Secret Fury (1950)
 The White Tower (1950)
 Vendetta (1950)
 Where Danger Lives (1950)
 Gambling House (1951)
 Flying Leathernecks (1951)
 Fixed Bayonets (1951)
 Sealed Cargo (1951)
 Operation Secret (1952)
 This is Cinerama (uncredited) (1952)
 Second Chance (1953)
 Split Second (1953)
 Houdini (1953)
 The Raid (1954)
 Dangerous Mission (1954)
 Track of the Cat (1954)
 Blood Alley (1955)
 Marty (1955)
 The Sea Chase (1955)
 Our Miss Brooks (1956)
 The Search for Bridey Murphy (1956)
 The Girl He Left Behind (1956)
 The River Changes (1956)
 The Secret Affair (1957)
 Shoot-out at Medicine Bend (1957)
 Teacher's Pet (1958)

References
Roy Webb: music for the films of Val Lewton (A.K.A. Cat people: classic music for the Val Lewton films) / Marco Polo 8.225125 – liner notes by Scott MacQueen, with Robert Wise and John Morgan.

Notes

External links
 Biography at Naxos site
 
 Roy Webb Sammy Film Music Award
 

American film score composers
American male film score composers
1888 births
1982 deaths
Columbia University alumni
Burials at Forest Lawn Memorial Park (Glendale)
20th-century American male musicians